Edson Eduardo Alvarado Torres (born April 24, 1998) is an American soccer player who currently plays as a midfielder for Los Angeles Force in the National Independent Soccer Association.

Alvarado made his debut with the Club Tijuana first team during the 2018 Copa MX. In 2019 he returned to California, joining Orange County SC U-23 in USL League Two. Alvarado was signed by the Orange County SC first team in USL Championship on June 27, 2019.

Career statistics

Club

Notes

References

1998 births
Living people
American sportspeople of Mexican descent
Sportspeople from Whittier, California
Soccer players from California
American soccer players
Association football midfielders
Club Tijuana footballers
Orange County SC U-23 players
Orange County SC players
USL League Two players
USL Championship players
American expatriate soccer players
American expatriate sportspeople in Mexico
Expatriate footballers in Mexico